Tovaria is a genus of herbs native to Jamaica and South America. There are two species, Tovaria pendula and Tovaria diffusa. The genus is the only one in the family Tovariaceae.

References

 http://www.mobot.org/MOBOT/Research/APweb/orders/brassicalesweb.htm#Tovariaceae

Brassicales
Brassicales genera
Flora of Mexico
Flora of Guatemala
Flora of Honduras
Flora of Nicaragua
Flora of Colombia
Flora of Venezuela
Flora of Ecuador
Flora of Peru
Flora of Bolivia
Flora of Jamaica
Flora without expected TNC conservation status